The Bhubaneswar–Tirupati Superfast Express is a Superfast train belonging to East Coast Railway zone that runs between Bhubaneswar and Tirupati in India. It is currently being operated with 22879/22880 train numbers on a weekly basis.

Service

The 22879/Bhubaneswar–Tirupati Weekly SF Express has an average speed of 55 km/hr and covers 1181 km in 21h 25m. The 22880/Tirupati Bhubaneswar Weekly SF Express has an average speed of 56 km/hr and covers 1181 km in 20h 55m.

Route & Halts 

The important halts of the train are:

Coach composite

The train has Modern LHB rakes with max speed of 110 kmph. The train consists of 22 coaches :

 1 AC II Tier
 4 AC III Tier
 11 Sleeper Coaches
 1 Pantry Car
 3 General Unreserved
 2 EOG

Traction

Both trains are hauled by a Visakhapatnam Loco Shed based WAP-7 electric locomotive from Bhubaneswar to Tirupati and vice versa.

Rake Sharing 

The train shares its rake with; 
 12819/12820 Odisha Sampark Kranti Express,
 12879/12880 Lokmanya Tilak Terminus–Bhubaneswar Superfast Express.

Notes

See also 

 Hapa railway station
 Madgaon Junction railway station
 Lokmanya Tilak Terminus–Bhubaneswar Superfast Express
 Odisha Sampark Kranti Express

References

External links 

 22879/Bhubaneswar - Tirupati Weekly SF Express
 22880/Tirupati - Bhubaneswar Weekly SF Express

Transport in Bhubaneswar
Transport in Tirupati
Express trains in India
Rail transport in Odisha
Rail transport in Andhra Pradesh
Railway services introduced in 2013